Poor people or Poor People may refer to:

People living in poverty
Poor Folk, first novel by Fyodor Dostoyevsky, some English translations of which are titled "Poor Folk"